Pearl of Great Price is the debut studio album of Will, released in December 1991 by Third Mind Records. It was composed from three years worth of recorded music leading up to its release.

Track listing

Personnel
Adapted from the Pearl of Great Price liner notes.

Will
 Rhys Fulber – keyboards, drum programming, production, engineering
 John McRae – vocals, art direction
 Chris Peterson – keyboards, production, engineering
 Jeff Stoddard – electric guitar

Production and additional personnel
 Kelly Alm – design
 Michael Balch – production, engineering
 John Dennison – photography

Release history

References

External links 
 

1991 debut albums
Will (band) albums
Third Mind Records albums
Albums produced by Rhys Fulber
Albums produced by Chris Peterson (producer)